Aranmanai Siruvayal is a village in the Sivaganga District in Tamil Nadu, India.

Geography 
A bridge is being constructed over the Sarugani River near Highway 29 connecting Kallal and Kalayarkoil.

British resistance 
Freedom fighter Chinna Marudu [Cheena Murdoo] resided in Siruvayal [Sherewele]. The Fort of Marudu Brothers (also called Marudhupandiyar Fort), built by the Marudu Brothers (Periya Marudu and Chinna Marudu) to resist the British, reduced to rubble in 1800. The British took control of the fort on 30 July 1800.

References

Further reading
http://www.sabrizain.org/malaya/library/reminiscences1.pdf
https://books.google.com/books?id=zjTneAGmatsC&pg=PA218&lpg=PA218&dq=%22Sherewele%22&source=bl&ots=WN315KKm6o&sig=ACfU3U2rKktiowD7zc4ZYFTKJ7kj0F_FHQ&hl=en&sa=X&ved=2ahUKEwjS_NnCh7H4AhWfI0QIHZaUBEMQ6AF6BAgTEAM#v=onepage&q=%22Sherewele%22&f=false
https://books.google.com/books?id=cZ4lpJgfXuYC&pg=PA765&lpg=PA765&dq=%22Sherewele%22&source=bl&ots=tGSw3ZVZ0l&sig=ACfU3U2OzyNz2l6-nmmmQ5O9bUuKJCWkqg&hl=en&sa=X&ved=2ahUKEwjS_NnCh7H4AhWfI0QIHZaUBEMQ6AF6BAgVEAM#v=onepage&q=%22Sherewele%22&f=false

Villages in Sivaganga district